Below are lists of notable French people of immigrant origin (at least one great-grandparent).

Algeria 
Actors and filmmakers

 Kev Adams, actor
 Isabelle Adjani, actress
 Daniel Auteuil, actor
 Jean-Pierre Bacri, actor
 Leïla Bekhti, actress
 Yamina Benguigui, film director, Junior Minister for French Nationals Abroad and Relations with La Francophonie (French-speaking countries worldwide) at the Ministry of Foreign Affairs
 Jean Benguigui, actor
 Richard Berry, actor
 Dany Boon, actor, comedian
 Rachid Bouchareb, film director
 Sofia Boutella, actress
 Rachida Brakni, actress
 Alain Chabat, comedian, film director, scriptwriter and producer
 Élie Chouraqui, film director, producer and scriptwriter
 Gérard Darmon, actor
 Samir Guesmi, actor
 Roger Hanin, actor filmmaker
 Hafsia Herzi, actress
 Salim Kechiouche, actor
 Claude Lelouch, film director, producer, scriptwriter and actor
 Jalil Lespert, actor
 Maïwenn, actress, film director
 Kad Merad, actor
 Samy Naceri, actor
 Marie-José Nat, actress
 Mehdi Nebbou, actor
 Safy Nebbou, actor
 Daniel Prévost, actor and comedian 
 Tahar Rahim, actor
 Sabrina Ouazani, actress
 Samy Seghir, actor
 Zinedine Soualem, actor
 Michaël Youn, actor
 Malik Zidi, actor

Singers and musicians

 Chimène Badi, singer
 Amel Bent, singer
 Cheb Mami, singer
 Chico Bouchikhi, singer, co-founder of the Gipsy Kings
 Patrick Bruel, singer
 Étienne Daho, singer
 DJ Mam's, DJ, music producer
 DJ Snake, DJ
 Quentin Elias, singer, part of Alliage
 Kenza Farah, singer
 Faudel, singer
 Indila, singer 
 Jenifer, singer
 Camélia Jordana, singer
 Khaled, singer
 Sheryfa Luna, singer
 Slimane, singer
 Enrico Macias, singer
 Médine, rapper
 Marcel Mouloudji, poet and singer
 Merwan Rim, singer
 Martial Solal, jazz pianist

Sportsmen

 Karim Benzema, footballer
 Nabil Fekir, footballer
 Alphonse Halimi, boxer
 Kylian Mbappé, footballer
 Maxime Mermoz,  professional rugby union footballer
 Riyad Mahrez, footballer
 Alfred Nakache, swimmer, water polo
 Samir Nasri, footballer 
 Alain Mimoun, Olympic marathon champion
 Brahim Zaibat, dancer 
 Zinedine Zidane, football manager and former player
 Rédouane Hennouni-Bouzidi, athlete

Others

 Fadela Amara, Secretary of State
 Kader Arif, Junior Minister for Veterans at the French Ministry of Defence
 Jacques Attali, economist, writer
 Amin Maalouf, author
 Alain Bashung, author, composer, performer and comedian
 Azouz Begag, writer and politician
 Nabilla Benattia, reality TV personality 
 Nina Bouraoui, writer
 Hélène Cixous, writer
 Annie Cohen-Solal, writer
 Claude Cohen-Tannoudji, physicist, Nobel Prize (1997)
 Jean-François Copé, politician
 Rachida Dati, Minister of Justice
 Jacques Derrida, philosopher
 Julien Dray, politician
 Jean-Pierre Elkabbach, journalist
 Bernard-Henri Lévy, writer and philosopher
 Arnaud Montebourg, France's Minister of Industrial Renewal since May 2012
 Benjamin Stora, historian

Argentina 

 Keny Arkana, singer and rap artist
 Bérénice Bejo, actress
 David Trezeguet, football player
 Bigflo & Oli, hip-hop duo

Armenia 

 Simon Abkarian, actor
 Serge Avédikian, producer
 Charles Aznavour, singer
 Édouard Balladur, former Prime Minister
 Jean Carzou, painter
 Patrick Devedjian, ministre
 Youri Djorkaeff, soccer player
 Patrick Fiori, singer
 Robert Guédiguian, film director
 Francis Kurkdjian, perfumer
 Marie Laforêt, actress
 Michel Legrand, musical composer, arranger, conductor, pianist and prolific film and television scores composer
 Missak Manouchian, poet, communist militant during World War II
 André Manoukian, composer, musician
 Mathieu Madénian, humorist, actor
 Alain Prost, racing driver
 Hélène Ségara, singer
 Jean Ter-Merguerian, violinist
 Michael Vartan, actor
 Sylvie Vartan, singer
 Francis Veber, film director, screenwriter and producer and theater playwright 
 Henri Verneuil, filmmaker

Australia 
 Tina Arena, singer 
 Katrina Patchett, dancer

Austria 

 Marie Antoinette, last queen of France, from 1774 until 1792
 Nora Arnezeder, actress
 Yael Grobglas, actress
 Romy Schneider, actress
 Erich von Stroheim, actor

Bangladesh 
 Zamor, servant of Madame du Barry

Belgium 

 Booba, rapper
 Jacqueline, Countess of Hainaut, dauphine of France
 Raymond Devos, humorist
 Fiona Ferro, tennis player 
 David Guetta, house music DJ
 Johnny Hallyday, singer
 Pierre Louÿs, poet and writer
 Olivier Minne, television presenter
 Iris Mittenaere, Miss France 2016
 Agnès Varda, film director

Benin 
 Flora Coquerel, Miss France 2014
 Rudy Gestede, footballer
Jules Koundé, footballer
Valériane Vukosavljević, basketball player

Bermuda 
 Vanessa James, figure skater

Bosnia 
 Josiane Balasko, actress

Brazil 

 Florent Amodio, figure skater
 Carla Bruni, singer and ex-First Lady of France
 Gil de Ferran, driver
 Jean-Louis de Rambures, journalist
 Carlos Ghosn, businessman
 Louane, singer
 Artur Avila, mathematician 
 Pierre, Duke of Penthièvre, French Duke 
 Princess Françoise of Orléans, French princess 
 Prince Antônio Gastão of Orléans-Braganza, Brazilian prince
 Prince Luís of Orléans-Braganza, Brazilian prince
 Princess Francisca of Brazil, Brazilian princess
 Princess Januária of Brazil, Brazlian princess

Bulgaria 

 Tzvetan Todorov, essayist and historian
 Sylvie Vartan, singer

Cambodia 
 Frédéric Chau, actor
 Indila, singer 
 Bérénice Marlohe, actress
 Elodie Yung, actress

Cameroon 

 Dieudonné M'bala M'bala, humorist
 Antoinette Nana Djimou, heptathlete and pentathlete
 Kylian Mbappé, footballer 
 Yannick Noah, former tennis player and singer
 Alex Song, footballer
 Aurélien Tchouaméni, footballer
 Gaëlle Nayo-Ketchanke, weightlifter
 Dora Tchakounté, weightlifter

Canada 

 Virginie Besson-Silla, film producer
 Deanna Durbin, actress and singer
 Mylène Farmer, singer
 Garou, singer
 Vanessa James, figure skater 
 Charlotte Le Bon, actress
 Axelle Lemaire, politician
 Mary Pierce, tennis player
 Natasha St-Pier, singer

Cape Verde 

 Patrice Evra, footballer
 Lisandro Cuxi, singer
 Sara Martins, actress

Central Africa Republic 
 Kurt Zouma, footballer

Chile 
 Sergio Coronado, politician
 Jena Lee, singer 
 Marisol Touraine, politician

China 

 Frédéric Chau, actor
 Steevy Chong Hue, footballer
 Mylène Jampanoï, actress
 Bérénice Marlohe, actress
 Jean Pasqualini, journalist
 Dai Sijie, author and filmmaker
 Harmony Tan, tennis player 
 Gao Xingjian, novelist
 Yiqing Yin, designer
 Jia Nan Yuan, tennis player
 Qi Xuefei, badminton player
 Pi Hongyan, badminton player
 Feng Xiao-min, artist
 Li Xue, table tennis player
 Lucie Zhang, actress
 Fan Hui, Go player

Comores 
 Rohff, rapper
 Soprano, singer
 Isaac Lihadji, footballer
 Arnaud Assoumani, athlete

Congo, Democratic Republic of the 

 Loïc Badiashile, footballer
 Presnel Kimpembe, footballer 
 Cheick Kongo, mixed martial artist 
 Steve Mandanda, footballer
 Blaise Matuidi, footballer
 Steven Nzonzi, footballer 
 Maître Gims, rapper
 Tony Yoka, boxer
 Eduardo Camavinga, footballer
 Madeleine Malonga, judoka

Congo, Republic of the 
 Yann M'Vila, footballer
 Yohan M'Vila, footballer
 Jo-Wilfried Tsonga, tennis player
 Séraphine Okemba, rugby player

Croatia 

 Josiane Balasko, actress
 Emmanuelle Béart, actress
 Tamara Horacek, handball player
 Nikola Karabatić, handball player 
 Marko Muslin, football player
 Grégory Sertic, football player 
 Adrien Thomasson, football player

Cuba 

 Chocolat, clown
 José-Maria de Heredia, poet
 Anaïs Nin, writer and novelist
 Marie de Régnier, poet

Cyprus 
 Diam's, singer

Denmark 
 Anna Karina, actress
 Ingeborg of Denamrk, queen of France in 1193

Egypt 

 Richard Anthony, singer
 Guy Béart, author, composer and performer
 Emmanuelle Béart, actress
 Andrée Chedid, poet and novelist
 Louis Chedid, singer
 Matthieu Chedid, author, composer, and rock performer
 Indila, singer 
 Nagui, TV and radio personality

England 

 Jane Birkin, actress
 Claudette Colbert, actress
 Nancy Cunard, writer 
 Deanna Durbin, actress and singer 
 Henrietta of England, English princess
 James FitzJames, military leader and son of James II of England  
 Emma, Lady Hamilton, model and actress
 Olivia de Havilland, actress
 Delilah, singer
 Charlotte Gainsbourg, actress
 François Grosjean, psycholinguist and specialist on bilingualism
 Louise de Kérouaille, mistress of Charles II of England 
 Emily Loizeau, singer
 Michael Lonsdale, actor
 Alexis Michalik, actor 
 Diana Mitford, socialite 
 Jeanne Moreau, actress and singer
 Oswald Mosley, politician 
 Charlotte Rampling, actress
 Matthew Raymond-Barker, singer
 Louisa Maria Stuart, princess, daughter of James II of England 
 Peter Townsend, Royal Air Force officer 
 Uffie, singer
 Lucy Walter, mistress of Charles II of England  
 Emma Watson, actress
 Eadgifu of Wessex, queen of France

Fiji 
 Alivereti Raka, rugby player
 Virimi Vakatawa, rugby player

Gabon 

 Estelle Nze Minko, handball player
 Orlann Ombissa-Dzangue, sprinter
 Pierre-Emerick Aubameyang, footballer
 Danièle Obono, politician
 Owanto, artist

Georgia 

 Dimitri Amilakhvari, colonel of French army
 Mamuka Gorgodze, rugby player
 Victoria Ravva, volleyball player
 Nino Maisuradze, chess player
 Tornike Gordadze, scientist
 Géla Babluani, film director
 Luka Mkheidze, judoka

Germany 

 Isabelle Adjani, actress
 Margravine Johanna of Baden-Baden, princess 
 Anne Henriette of Bavaria, princess
 Isabeau of Bavaria, queen of France from 1385 until 1422
 Maria Anna Victoria of Bavaria, dauphine of France
 Sophie Charlotte of Bavaria, duchess consort of Alençon 
 Daniel Cohn-Bendit, politician
 Laurent Fabius, politician
 Claire Feuerstein, tennis player 
 Marina Foïs, actress
 Jean-Jacques Goldman, singer
 Antoine Griezmann, footballer
 Robert Guédiguian, film director
 Adèle Haenel, actress 
 Stéphane Hessel, diplomat, writer
 Patricia Kaas, singer 
 Gérard Lenorman, singer
 Louane, singer
 Helene of Mecklenburg-Schwerin, Crown Princess
 Jacques Offenbach, composer and cellist
 Edward, Count Palatine of Simmern, count 
 Elizabeth Charlotte, Madame Palatine, princess
 Louise Hollandine of the Palatinate, princess, abbess and painter
 Victoria of Saxe-Coburg and Gotha, princess 
 Gerberga of Saxony, queen of France from 939 to 954
 Romy Schneider, actress
 Albert Schweitzer, theologian, organist and writer 
 Gertrude Stein, novelist, poet and playwright 
 Wendelin Werner, mathematician

Greece 

 Vassilis Alexakis, writer
 Nikos Aliagas, talk show host, singer
 Maria Callas, soprano
 Diam's, singer 
 Adele Exarchopoulos, actress
 Georges Guétary, singer and dancer 
 Gilles Marini, actor
 Georges Moustaki, singer
 Jean Moréas, poet
 Gabriella Papadakis, figure skater
 Agnès Varda, film director 
 Iannis Xenakis, composer

Guinea 

 Black M, rapper
 Mohamed Sylla, rapper
 Paul Pogba, footballer

Haiti 

 Edgar Degas, artist
 Alexandre Dumas, writer 
 Thomas-Alexandre Dumas, general 
 Wagneau Eloi, football player
 Kery James, rapper
 Presnel Kimpembe, footballer 
 Toussaint Louverture, leader of Haitian Revolution 
 Johny Placide, football player
 Charles Terres Weymann, aeroplane racing pilot

Hungary 

 Lorànt Deutsch, actor and writer
 Clementia of Hungary, queen of France from 1315 until 1316
 Mathieu Kassovitz, film director
 Nicolas Sarkozy, French president
 Sylvie Vartan, singer

India 
 Indila, singer
 Rudgy Pajany, singer
 J. R. D. Tata, aviator

 Prithika Pavade, table tennis player
 Shumona Sinha, writer

Indonesia 
 Anggun, singer

Iran 

 Soraya Esfandiary-Bakhtiary, queen of Iran from 1951 until 1958
 Golshifteh Farahani, actress
 Robert Hossein, actor, filmmaker
 Yasmina Reza, filmmaker
 Aravane Rezaï, tennis player
 Marjane Satrapi, cartoonist and film director
 Alireza Firouzja, chess player

Ireland 

 Samuel Beckett, novelist and writer
 Anastasia Griffith, actress
 Margaret Kelly, dancer
 Jeanne Moreau, actress
 Marie-Louise O'Murphy, mistress of Louis XV
 Oscar Wilde, writer

Israel 
 Tal, singer
 Arcadi Gaydamak, businessman and philanthropist
 Alexandre Gaydamak, businessman

Italy 

 Roberto Alagna, tenor
 Jean Alesi, racing driver
 Claude Bartolone, President of the National Assembly
 Jean-Paul Belmondo, actor
 Jules Bianchi, motor racing driver
 Caroline Bonaparte, sister of Napoleon and queen of Naples from 1808 to 1815
 Elisa Bonaparte, sister of Napoleon and duchess of Toscany from 1809 to 1814
 Jérôme Bonaparte, brother of Napoleon and king of Westphalia from 1807 to 1813
 Joseph Bonaparte, brother of Napoleon and king of Spain from 1808 to 1813
 Letizia Bonaparte, noblewoman and mother of Napoleon
 Louis Bonaparte, brother of Napoleon and king of Holland from 1806 to 1810
 Lucien Bonaparte, brother of Napoleon
 Pauline Bonaparte, sister of Napoleon and duchess of Guastalla in 1806
 Napoleon Bonaparte, statesman and military leader
 Maria Carolina of Bourbon Two-Sicilies, princess 
 Georges Brassens, singer
 Carla Bruni, singer and ex-First Lady of France
 Carlo Buonaparte, lawyer, diplomat and father of Napoleon
 Calogero, singer
 Laetitia Casta, actress and model
 François Cavanna, writer
 Francis Cabrel, singer
 Lorenzo Callegari, football player
 Philippe Candeloro, patineur
 Eric Cantona, actor and footballer
 Concino Concini, politician 
 Nicolas Cozza, football player
 Dalida, singer
 Edgar Degas, artist 
 Leonora Dori, courtier 
 Maria Teresa Felicitas d'Este, princess 
 Laurence Ferrari, journalist
 Léo Ferré, singer
 Aurélie Filippetti, Minister of Culture and Communication
 Geneviève Fioraso, Minister of Higher Education and Research
 Marina Foïs, actress
 Florence Foresti, comedian and actress
 Raymond Forni,  politician
 Claude François, singer
 Joseph Gallieni,  marshal of France
 Max Gallo, writer and historian
 Léon Gambetta, politician and statesman
 Emma of Italy, queen of France from 965 until 986
 Rozala of Italy, queen of France from 988 until 996
 Fabrice Luchini, actor
 Jean-Baptiste Lully, composer
 Elsa Lunghini, singer
 Gilles Marini, actor
 Anne Marie Martinozzi, aristocrat
 Chiara Mastroianni, actress
 Cardinal Mazarin, cardinal, diplomat and politician 
 Catherine de'Medici, queen of France from 1547 until 1559
 Marie de' Medici, queen of France from 1600 until 1610
 Amedeo Modigliani, painter 
 Yves Montand (Ivo Livi), actor
 Maria Amalia of Naples and Sicily, queen of France from 1830 until 1848
 Edith Piaf, singer
 Michel Platini, football administrator and former player
 Marie Adélaïde of Savoy, dauphine of France
 Hélène Ségara, actress
 Sylvie Testud, actress
 Albert Uderzo, writer, humorist and cartoonist, creator of Asterix
 Valentina Visconti, duchess consort of Orléans 
 Mario Zatelli, footballer 
 Émile Zola, writer

Ivory Coast 

 Basile Boli, footballer 
 Jean-Daniel Akpa Akpro, footballer
 Isabelle Boni-Claverie, author, screenwriter, and director
 Grégory Choplin, kickboxer
 Marie-Laure Delie, footballer
 Didier Drogba, footballer
 Kaaris, rapper
 Cédric Kipré, footballer
 Maé-Bérénice Méité, figure skater
 Véronique Tadjo, writer
 Charles-Antoine Kouakou, athlete

Jamaica 
 Zita Hanrot, actress

Japan 

 Kenzō Takada, designer
 Megumi Satsu, singer
 Morio Matsui, artist
 Uffie, singer

Kenya 

 Susan Jeptooo Kipsang, athlete
 Simon Munyutu, athlete

Laos 

 Thu Kamkasomphou, table tennis player
 Anousone Prasitharath, footballer
 Kayane, esports player
 Billy Ketkeophomphone, footballer

Lebanon 

 Louis Chedid, singer, songwriter
 Matthieu Chedid, aka -M-, rock guitarist
 Gilbert Collard, writer, barrister and politician; one of his great grandfathers, Fatallah Tarrazi, was from Lebanon
 Carlos Ghosn, chairman and CEO of Renault-Nissan-Mitsubishi alliance
 Eid Hourany, nuclear physicist
 Antoine Karam, politician, President of the Regional Council of French Guiana
 Vénus Khoury-Ghata, writer, poet
 Thomas Langmann, film producer, actor of Lebanese Jewish descent
 Amin Maalouf, author, novelist
 Ibrahim Maalouf, musician, trumpet player, composer
 Pierre-Antoine Melki, aka Nius, music producer
 Mika (singer), singer
 William Saliba, footballer

Lithuania 

 Joseph Kessel, writer
 Emmanuel Levinas, philosopher
 Michel Hazanavicius, film director

Mali 
 N'Golo Kanté, footballer 
 Aya Nakamura, singer 
 Alassane Pléa, footballer 
 Djibril Sidibé, footballer
 Moussa Sissoko, footballer
 Siraba Dembélé Pavlović, handball player

Mauritius 

 Vikash Dhorasoo, footballer
 Henri Le Sidaner, painter
 Alix d'Unienville, spy
 Willy William, singer
 Adam Siao Him Fa, figure skater

Mexico 
 Carlos de Beistegui, art collector and decorator
 Dominique Fernandez, writer
 Adan Jodorowsky, actor and musician
 Porfirio Díaz, 29th President of Mexico

Moldova 
 Cécilia Attias,  second wife of Nicolas Sarkozy
 Almira Skripchenko, chess player

Morocco 

 Ary Abittan, actor 
 Richard Anconina, actor
 Pierre Assouline, journalist
 Aure Atika, actress
 José Bénazéraf, film director, scriptwriter and producer
 Rachida Dati, politician
 Jamel Debbouze, humorist
 Gad Elmaleh, humorist
 Sofia Essaïdi, singer and actress
 David Guetta, house music DJ
 Roger Karoutchi, politician
 Yasmine Lafitte, pornstar
 Élie Semoun, humorist
 Sofiane Oumiha, boxer
 Saïd Taghmaoui, actor
 Elisa Tovati, actress
 Najat Vallaud-Belkacem, French Minister of Women's Rights and spokesperson for the government since May 2012
 Roschdy Zem, actor
 Amel Bent, singer
 Amine, singer
 Amir, singer
 Frida Boccara, singer
 Booba, rapper
 Édith Piaf, singer
 La Fouine, rapper, singer
 Sapho, singer
 Adil Rami, footballer

Netherlands 

 Mata Hari, exotic dancer and a spy
 Tony Parker, basketball player
 Vincent van Gogh, painter
 Bertha of Holland, queen of France from 1072 until 1092
 Ary Scheffer, painter

New Zealand 
 Katherine Mansfield, writer

Norway 
 Eva Joly, politician and former judge
 Alexis Pinturault, alpine ski racer
 Yann Tiersen, musician

Peru 
 Jorge Chávez, aviator
 Elodie Frenck, actress
 Flora Tristan, socialist writer and activist
 Verónika Mendoza, psychologist, educator, and politician

Philippines 
 Alphonse Areola, footballer
 Neal Maupay, footballer

Poland 

 Guillaume Apollinaire, writer
 Robert Badinter, lawyer, academic, essayist and politician
 Stephane Bern, journalist, radio host and television presentator 
 Claude Berri, film director
 Juliette Binoche, actress
 Marie-George Buffet, politician
 Frédéric Chopin, pianist
 Eve Curie, writer  
 Marie Curie, physicist and chemist 
 Alain Finkielkraut, philosopher, writer and essayist
 Jean-Pierre Foucault, television personality
 Judith Godrèche, actress
 Jean-Jacques Goldman, singer
 René Goscinny, writer, humorist, known around the world for the Asterix books
 Władysław Czartoryski, noble 
 Constance Jablonski, model
 Michel Jazy, middle distance runner
 Irène Joliot-Curie, scientist 
 Raymond Kopa, football player
 Laurent Koscielny, football player
 Nathalie Kosciusko-Morizet, politician
 Marie Leszczyńska, queen of France from 1725 until 1768
 Louane, singer 
 Jean-Marie Lustiger, Archbishop of Paris
 Frédéric Michalak, rugby player
 Alexis Michalik, actor
 Jean-Pierre Mocky, film director
 Natoo, YouTuber 
 Ludovic Obraniak, football player
 Damien Perquis, football player
 M. Pokora, singer
 Roman Polanski, film director
 Michel Poniatowski, politician
 Catherine Ringer, singer
 Maria Josepha of Saxony, dauphine of France
 Simone Signoret, actress
 Marie Walewska, noblewoman and mistress of Napoleon I
 Michel Wieviorka, sociologue
 Georges Wolinski, cartoonist and comics writer

Portugal 

 Guy-Manuel de Homem-Christo, musician (Daft Punk member)
 Linda de Suza, singer
 Kevin Gameiro, footballer
 Antoine Griezmann, footballer
 Louane, singer 
 Marie Myriam, singer
 Morgan Parra, rugby player
 Robert Pires, footballer
 Lisandro Cuxi, singer
 Steven Da Costa, karateka

Romania 

 Jean-François Copé, politician
 Claude Berri, film director
 Michel Drucker,  French journalist and TV host
 Eugène Ionesco, writer
 Cyprien Iov, YouTube celebrity
 Michèle Laroque, actress
 Pierre Moscovici, politician
 Anna de Noailles, writer and socialist 
 Ana Cata-Chitiga, basketball player 
 Cédric Pioline, tennis player
 Élisabeth Roudinesco, historian
 Maria Schneider, actress
 Paul-Loup Sulitzer, writer
 Pierre Vassiliu, singer

Russia 
 
 
 Irina Alexandrovna, Russian princess
 Natalia Brasova, Russian noblewoman 
 Amira Casar, actress 
 Carlos, singer
 Marc Chagall, painter
 Joe Dassin, singer
 Catherine Dolgorukov, mistress of tsar Alexander II of Russia 
 François Feldman, singer
 Charlotte Gainsbourg, actress
 Serge Gainsbourg, singer, poet, actor and director 
 Judith Godrèche, actress
 Olga Khokhlova, ballet dancer
 Pom Klementieff, actress
 Olga Kurylenko, actress
 Vladislav Tkachiev, chess player
 Rudolf Nureyev, dancer 
 Gérard Oury, film director
 Léon Poliakov, historian
 Michel Polnareff, singer
 Maxime Rodinson, historian
 Thierry Roland, TV commentator
 Nathalie Sarraute, writer
 Jacques Tati, film director and actor
 Marina Vlady, actress
 Felix Yusupov, Russian aristocrat
 Irina Yusupova, Russian princess 
 Léon Zitrone, journalist

Rwanda 

 Sonia Rolland, actress and Miss France 2000

Scotland 
 Michel Adanson, botanist and naturalist 
 Henri d'Angoulême, military commander during the Wars of Religion.
 Brice Lalonde, politician
 Sebastian Roché, actor
 Janet Stewart, mistress of Henry II
 Margaret Stewart, dauphine of France

Senegal 

 Booba, rapper
 Patrice Evra, footballer
 Bafétimbi Gomis, footballer
 Aïssa Maïga, actress
 Benjamin Mendy, footballer
 MC Solaar, rap and hip hop artist
 Omar Sy, actor
 Patrick Vieira, footballer
 Rama Yade, politician
 Mouhamadou Fall, sprinter

Serbia 

 Pierre Marinovitch, World War I flying ace
 Kristina Mladenovic, tennis player
 Sebastian, musician and DJ
 Vladimir Veličković, painter
 Stefan Bajic, footballer

South Africa 
 Pieter de Villiers, rugby player
 Brian Liebenberg, rugby player
 Gerhard Vosloo, rugby player

South Korea 

 Julien Kang, actor
 Daul Kim, model
 Pom Klementieff, actress
 Fleur Pellerin, Ministry of Culture
 Jean-Vincent Placé, politician
 Lydie Solomon, pianist
 Joachim Son-Forget, politician

Spain 

 Anne of Austria, queen of France from 1615 until 1643
 Ruben Aguilar, footballer 
 Àstrid Bergès-Frisbey, actress
 Albert Camus, Nobel Prize-winning author
 Eric Cantona, actor and footballer
 Blanche of Castile, queen of France from 1223 until 1226
 Manu Chao, singer and musician
 Raymond Domenech, former Manager of the French national soccer team
 Anh Duong, actress and model
 Luis Fernández, football player
 Louis de Funès, actor
 José Garcia, actor
 Lucas Hernandez, footballer 
 Theo Hernandez, footballer 
 Anne Hidalgo, politician
 Raphaël Ibañez, rugby player
 Virginie Ledoyen, actress
 Frédéric Lopez, television host
 Maria Theresa of Spain, queen of France from 1660 until 1683
 Maria Teresa Rafaela of Spain, dauphine of France
 Caroline Garcia, tennis player
 Maria Malibran, mezza-soprano
 Olivier Martinez, actor
 Jean-Luc Mélenchon, politician
 Eugénie de Montijo, the last Empress of France from 1853 until 1870
 La Belle Otero, actress and dancer
 Pablo Picasso, painter and sculptor 
 Paloma Picasso, fashion designer
 Robert Pires, footballer
 David Pujadas, journalist
 Alexandre Lloveras, cyclist
 Jean Reno, actor
 Olivia Ruiz, singer
 Jaime Semprún, essayist and translator
 Fernando Sor, guitarist and composer 
 André Téchiné, film director
 Mathieu Valbuena, footballer
 Manuel Valls, French Socialist Party (PS) politician, Minister of the Interior
 Ray Ventura,  jazz bandleader
 Pauline Viardot, mezza-soprano

Sweden 

 Eva Green, actress
 Mathilda May, actress
 Max von Sydow, actor

Switzerland 
 Benjamin Constant, activist and writer
 Fabrice Ehret, football player
 Joseph Favre, chef
 Françoise Giroud, journalist, writer ans politician 
 Eugène Grasset, artist 
 Jean-Luc Godard, film director
 Romain Grosjean, racing driver
 Le Corbusier, architect
 Jean-Paul Marat, journalist and politician during French Revolution 
 Quentin Mosimann, musician
 Jacques Necker, banker
 Jean-Jacques Rousseau, writer and composer

Thailand 
 Emmanuelle Arsan, novelist 
 Tristan Do, footballer

Togo 

 Corentin Tolisso, footballer
 Clarisse Agbegnenou, judoka
 Angelina Lanza, athlete

Tunisia 

 Ary Abittan, actor 
 Kev Adams, actor
 Sami Bouajila, actor
 Michel Boujenah, humorist
 Dany Brillant, singer
 Georges Cravenne,  founder of the César Award
 Marcel Dadi, guitar player
 Morhad Amdouni, runner
 Hamida Djandoubi, murderer and last person executed in France
 Gisèle Halimi, lawyer
 Serge Halimi, journalist
 Cyril Hanouna, television presenter, producer and comedian
 Agnès Jaoui, actress
 David Jemmali, soccer player
 Abdellatif Kechiche,  film director
 Lââm, singer
 Pierre Lellouche, politician
 Didier Marouani, composer and musician
 Albert Memmi, writer
 Serge Moati, journalist and film director
 Yael Naim, singer
 Dominique Strauss-Kahn, politician
 Ariel Zeitoun, film director, scriptwriter and producer
 Tunisiano, rapper
 Riadh Tarsim, cyclist
 Wissam Ben Yedder, footballer

Turkey 

 Mirra Alfassa, spiritual guru 
 Édouard Balladur, politician 
 Cansel Elçin, actor
 Mevlüt Erdinç, footballer
 Deniz Gamze Ergüven, film director 
 Françoise Giroud, journalist, writer and politician 
 Nedim Gürsel, writer
 Mustapha Haciane, novelist and poet 
 Tchéky Karyo, actor
 Mathilda May, actress
 Elif Shafak, novelist and women's right activist 
 Benjamin Stambouli, footballer 
 Atila Turan, footballer

Ukraine 
 Mylène Demongeot, actress
 Pierre Bérégovoy, politician
 Serge Gainsbourg, singer
 Charlotte Gainsbourg, actress
 Olga Kurylenko, actress
 Serge Lifar, dancer and choreographer
 Oksana Shachko, artist and activist
 Alexandra Shevchenko, artist and activist
 Anne of Kiev, queen of France from 1051 until 1060

United States 

 Josephine Baker, dancer
 Mickey Baker, guitarist
 Sylvia Beach, bookseller 
 Sidney Bechet, jazz saxophonist
 Àstrid Bergès-Frisbey, actress
 Leos Carax, film director 
 Leslie Caron, actress
 Natalie Clifford Barney, writer
 Alexa Davalos, actress
 Edgar Degas, artist
 Lily-Rose Depp, actress
 Isadora Duncan, dancer
 Carole Fredericks, singer
 Loïe Fuller, dancer
 Virginie Amélie Avegno Gautreau, socialite 
 Guy Georges, serial killer
 Franz-Olivier Giesbert, television presenter
 Anastasia Griffith, actress
 Rosella Hightower, dancer 
 Andrea King, actress
 Brice Lelonde, politician 
 Tonie Marshall, film director
 Chloé Mortaud, actress and Miss France 2009
 Tony Parker, basketball player
 Mary Pierce, tennis player
 Man Ray, painter and photographer 
 Nina Simone, singer
 Yeardley Smith, actress and voice actress
 Gertrude Stein, novelist, poet and playwright

Uruguay 
 Jules Laforgue, poet
 Elli Medeiros, singer
 Jules Supervielle, poet

Venezuela 
 Serge Blanco, former rugby union footballer 
 Marisol Escobar, sculptor
 Laurence Debray, writer

Vietnam 

 Ngô Bảo Châu, mathematician 
 Linh Dan Pham, actress
 Aliette de Bodard, writer
 Anh Duong, actress and model
 Kayane, electronic sports player and journalist 
 Nikolai Kinski, actor
 Thích Nhất Hạnh, Buddhist monk and peace activist 
 Trần Anh Hùng, film director 
 France Nuyen, actress
 François Trinh-Duc, rugby player
 Bopha Kong, taekwondo practitioner

See also 
 Immigration to France
 Demographics of France

References 

Immigrant
Immigrant origin